Sanjar Fayziev (born 29 July 1994) is an Uzbekistani tennis player.

Fayziev has a career high ATP singles ranking of 253 achieved on 17 July 2017. He also has a career high ATP doubles ranking of 190 achieved on 20 June 2022. Fayziev has won 2 ATP Challenger doubles titles and 7 ITF singles and 16 ITF doubles title.

Fayziev has represented Uzbekistan at the Davis Cup where he has a W/L record of 7–16.

ATP Challenger and ITF Futures finals

Singles: 17 (7–10)

Doubles: 34 (17–17)

Davis Cup

Participations: (7–16)

   indicates the outcome of the Davis Cup match followed by the score, date, place of event, the zonal classification and its phase, and the court surface.

External links

1994 births
Living people
Uzbekistani male tennis players
Sportspeople from Tashkent
Tennis players at the 2014 Asian Games
Tennis players at the 2018 Asian Games
Asian Games bronze medalists for Uzbekistan
Medalists at the 2014 Asian Games
Asian Games medalists in tennis
Universiade medalists in tennis
Universiade gold medalists for Uzbekistan
Medalists at the 2019 Summer Universiade
21st-century Uzbekistani people